The A23 road is a major road in the United Kingdom between London and Brighton, East Sussex, England. It is managed by Transport for London for the section inside the Greater London boundary, Surrey County Council and West Sussex County Council for the section shadowed by the M23 motorway, National Highways (as a trunk road) between the M23 and Patcham, and by Brighton and Hove Council from the A27 to the centre of Brighton.

The road has been a major route for centuries, and seen numerous upgrades, bypasses and diversions.

Route 
The A23 begins near Lambeth North tube station. Formerly, it started as Westminster Bridge Road near Waterloo station, but this is now part of the A302. Almost immediately it turns south; the straightness of much of the heading south shows its Roman origins.

The road becomes:
 Brixton Road
 Brixton Hill
 Streatham Hill
 Streatham High Road
 at Norbury the road becomes London Road; after , at
 Thornton Heath the Croydon bypass, Thornton Road and then Purley Way (known for its superstores, particularly IKEA, and for the site of Croydon Airport) takes the place of the original road through Croydon, now the A235, rejoining the A23 at Purley near the Purley War Memorial Hospital, now named Brighton Road.
 continuing south through Coulsdon on the Farthing Way (the relief road for Coulsdon town centre, opened in 2006), over the North Downs to Hooley, the start of the M23 motorway.
 here is now Surrey
 through the built-up areas of Merstham, Redhill and Salfords, skirting Horley
 here is now West Sussex
 making an end-on connection with the M23 spur to Gatwick Airport the A23 becomes a dual carriageway as it is diverted round the airport; it rejoins the original route at Lowfield Heath and continues south into Crawley as London Road
 Crawley ByPass: the original road was through the town
 Pease Pottage, southern junction with the M23
 through the relatively rural countryside of West Sussex, before following along valleys to cross the South Downs and entering Brighton
here is now East Sussex
 becomes the London Road, Brighton, passing under the London Road railway viaduct 
 the road ends at Old Steine, Brighton, at a roundabout intersecting with the coastal A259 road, and opposite the entrance to the Palace Pier.

Major roads intersected by the A23 

 A3 and A202 at Kennington
 A205 South Circular Road at Streatham Hill
 A214 at Streatham
 A232 at Waddon
 M23 close to Junction 7 (no southbound access)
 A25 at Redhill
 A264 at Crawley
 M23 at Pease Pottage
 A272 at Bolney
 A27 Brighton Bypass at Mill Road Roundabout

History
What is now the A23 became an arterial route following the construction of Westminster Bridge in 1750 and the consequent improvement of roads leading to the bridge south of the river by the turnpike trusts. The increase in population of Brighton in the late eighteenth century, which transformed it from a small fishing village to a large seaside resort, enhanced the importance of this road, as did the residence there of George IV, as Prince of Wales, who made Brighton a place of fashion.

When roads were originally classified, the A23 started at Purley Cross. The road north of this section, including Purley Way, which opened to traffic in April 1925, was part of the A22. The current route north to Westminster Bridge dates from April 1935.

The A23 in London has frequently been one of the city's most congested roads. The M23 motorway was originally proposed to run as far north as Streatham, relieving congestion on the route, but the section north of Hooley was never built. At junction 7 of the M23 motorway, signs for the northbound M23 (which terminates a few miles to the north) simply read "Croydon" with no other London destinations marked.

In July 2000, control of the section of road inside the Greater London boundary was transferred from the Highways Agency to Transport for London. This caused delays to a planned relief road of Coulsdon, which had been announced in 1998. The then mayor, Ken Livingstone apologised in 2002 that TfL was unable to construct the relief road due to a lack of funds. The road was eventually completed in 2007, and which under TfL's ownership had acquired a bus lane that suffered ridicule for not having any buses actually running on it.

On 18 March 2010, plans to widen the section between Handcross and Warninglid in West Sussex to three lanes, removing an accident prone bend, were given the go ahead.  Work started in autumn 2011 and the scheme was completed and opened in October 2014, with a better-than-expected improvement to safety.

London to Brighton Veteran Run
The  road from London to Brighton forms the basis of the route of the annual London to Brighton Veteran Car Run. This is featured in the film ''Genevieve':, although most of the rural motoring scenes were shot in Buckinghamshire. The A23 is also used for various other London to Brighton events, although in many cases part of the route diverges to parallel roads to reduce congestion or add variety.

See also 
 Great Britain road numbering scheme

References

External links 
 SABRE page on the A23

Streets in the London Borough of Croydon
Streets in the London Borough of Lambeth
Roads in London
Roads in Surrey
Transport in Crawley
Roads in West Sussex
Roads in East Sussex